Tons of Trouble is a 1956 black and white British comedy film directed by Leslie S. Hiscott and starring Richard Hearne, William Hartnell and Austin Trevor.

Plot
The eccentric caretaker of a block of flats, Mr. Pastry (Richard Hearne), is in charge of two of its boilers, whom he lovingly calls "Mavis" and "Ethel." His affection for the pair leads him into unforeseen problems, and he's fired from his job. Meanwhile, wealthy Sir Hervey Shaw (Austin Trevor) is searching for Mr. Pastry to close an important business deal. Mr. Pastry is found just in the nick of time to save both Sir Hervey's deal, and the temperamental "Ethel", who is on the verge of exploding.

Cast

 Richard Hearne as Mr. Pastry
 William Hartnell as Bert
 Austin Trevor as Sir Hervey Shaw
 Joan Marion as Angela Shaw
 Robert Moreton as Jevons
 Ralph Truman as Inspector Bridger
 Ronald Adam as Psychiatrist
 Junia Crawford as Diana Little
 Tony Quinn as Cracknell
 John Stuart as Doctor
  Yvonne Hearne as Matron	
  Angela Proctor as Sir Hervey's secretary	
 William Mervyn as Roberts (MI5)	
  Neil Wilson as Milligan	
  John Raikes as Sir Hervey's male secretary	
  Mary Calnan as B.E.A. Girl	
  Sylvia Bidmead as Swissair Girl	
  Cyril Rennison as Plain Clothes Policeman	
  Harrington Brian as Police Doctor	
  John Adams as Policeman

Critical reception
TV Guide wrote, "Surprisingly, this offbeat story works with some good humor, the elements mixing with effectiveness."

References

External links
 

1956 films
1956 comedy films
1950s English-language films
British comedy films
Films shot at Elstree Studios
Films directed by Leslie S. Hiscott
1950s British films
British black-and-white films